Gelsemium rankinii, the Rankin's trumpetflower or swamp jessamine, is a twining vine in the family Gelsemiaceae, native to the southeastern United States from Louisiana to the Carolinas.

Gelsemium rankinii is a vine that will climb over other vegetation to a height of 6 meters (20 feet) or more. It has glossy green leaves and groups of showy yellow flowers.

References

External links
North Carolina State University Cooperative Extension

Gelsemiaceae
Flora of the Southeastern United States
Plants described in 1928
Flora without expected TNC conservation status